Nikolay Todorov (born 24 August 1996) is a Bulgarian footballer who plays as a centre-forward for Dunfermline Athletic.

Todorov is a Bulgaria U21 international. Known for his physical presence, good in either box in defence or attack; a powerful player and very good in the air; good with both feet. At the age of 7, Todorov started his career with Spartak Pleven's youth system before winning a scholarship in England. In 2014, he joined Nottingham Forest in their Under-21s academy, loan spells followed at Hemel Hempstead and Worcester City in England.

Todorov joined Heart of Midlothian in 2016, loan spells followed at Cowdenbeath and Livingston where he was part of the 2017–18 promotion winning team finishing as champions. He spent the first half of the 2017–18 season back on loan at Livingston, before spending the second half of the season at Queen of the South. He subsequently had a short spell in Italy with Rieti, before returning to Scotland with Falkirk and then Inverness Caledonian Thistle.

Career
Born in Pleven, Todorov joined FC Pleven's Academy at seven years old. In 2011, he joined Brooke House College and played three years for the college's football team, Brooke House College Football Academy under manager Ben Watts.

In 2014, Todorov joined Nottingham Forest at Under-21 level. On 10 January 2015, he signed his second professional contract with the club. Although he played for the Under-21s, he failed to feature for the first team and was officially released in May 2016.

Todorov had already joined up with Scottish Premiership club Heart of Midlothian in April 2016, to try earn himself a contract. After a successful two-month trial period, he then signed a one-year contract in June 2016. In July 2016, Todorov had a six-month loan spell at Scottish League Two club Cowdenbeath. He made his debut on the opening day of the 2016–17 season in a 1–0 home defeat to Elgin City on 6 August 2016. The following week, Todorov scored his first ever league goal in a 4–3 away loss at Forfar Athletic, with a header from a cross six yards out in the 59th minute. Todorov was mainly played as a centre back due to an injury crisis, before being recalled by Hearts in January 2017. Todorov then went on loan to Livingston in January 2017, helping Livingston win the 2016–17 Scottish League One title. He signed a new one-year contract with Hearts at the end of the 2016–17 season. Todorov spent the first half of the 2017–18 season back on loan at Livingston.

On 31 January 2018, Todorov joined Queen of the South on loan for the remainder of the 2017–18 season.

On 14 August 2018, Todorov signed a two-year contract with Italian Serie C club Rieti. He then returned to Scottish football in January 2019, signing for Falkirk. Following Falkirk's relegation to League One, he left and signed for Inverness Caledonian Thistle.

International career
Todorov has represented Bulgaria on U15, U16 and U21 level. On 30 May 2017, he received his first call-up for Bulgaria U21 for the friendly matches against Georgia U21 and Greece U21 on 8 and 12 June 2017.

Style of play
Todorov is primarily a centre forward, he can however be utilised as a centre back; two-footed, he has the ability to score with his right foot, as well as his left foot, he is a big, powerful strong player and good in the air.

Personal life
His father is also called Nikolay Todorov (born 1964), who was also a professional footballer and playing for the national team of Bulgaria.

On 1 February 2019 he married his Scottish girlfriend Jennifer Clark in a small ceremony.

Career statistics

Honours

Club
Livingston
Scottish League One: 2016–17

Club
Inverness Caledonian Thisle 
Scottish Challenge Cup: 2019-20

Individual
PFA Scotland Team of the Year: 2020–21 Scottish Championship

References

External links
 
 

1996 births
Sportspeople from Pleven
Living people
Bulgarian footballers
Bulgaria youth international footballers
Association football forwards
Nottingham Forest F.C. players
Worcester City F.C. players
Hemel Hempstead Town F.C. players
Heart of Midlothian F.C. players
Cowdenbeath F.C. players
Livingston F.C. players
Scottish Professional Football League players
Queen of the South F.C. players
F.C. Rieti players
Falkirk F.C. players
Inverness Caledonian Thistle F.C. players
Dunfermline Athletic F.C. players
Serie C players
Bulgarian expatriate footballers
Expatriate footballers in England
Expatriate footballers in Scotland
Expatriate footballers in Italy